'Down by the River' is a song by Australian hip hop trio Bliss n Eso. It released on 14 May 2010 through Illusive Sounds as the first single from the trio's fourth studio album Running On Air. The song debuted at No. 83 on the ARIA Singles Chart, it peaked at No. 45 on its 12th week on the chart. It also finished at No. 41 on the Triple J Hottest 100 for 2010. In 2013, 'Down by the River' was accredited gold by the Australian Recording Industry Association for sales/shipments of 35,000 copies.

Music video
The song's accompanying music video was released on Bliss n Eso's official YouTube channel on 16 June 2010, it achieved over 300,000 and an alternate upload has around 1 million views. In the video, Bliss n Eso move quickly through a forest while they rap the song, as well as go BMX riding, fishing and riding wheelie bins.

Chart performance
The song debuted at No. 83 on the ARIA Singles Chart, in its 12th week it peaked at No. 45 and spent a total of 18 weeks on the chart. In 2013, 3 years after its release, "Down by the River" was certified gold for sales/shipments of over 35,000 copies.

Charts

Certifications

References

Bliss n Eso songs
2010 songs
2010 singles
Illusive Sounds singles